Alaska Routes are both numbered and named. There have been only twelve state highway numbers issued (1 through 11 and 98), and the numbering often has no obvious pattern. For example, Alaska Route 4 (AK-4) runs north and south, whereas AK-2 runs largely east and west, but runs north and south passing through and to the north of Fairbanks. The Klondike Highway, built in 1978, was unnumbered until 1998, when it was given its designation during the centennial of the Klondike Gold Rush. However, many Alaskan highways of greater length than the Klondike Highway remain unnumbered.

Mileposts, frequently used for road markers and official addressing in rural areas, are also more commonly reckoned by landmark names.

Within Alaska, roads are almost invariably referred to by name or general destination, and not by number(s).

Numbered routes often span multiple highway names. For example, AK-1 can refer to any of the Glenn Highway, Seward Highway, Sterling Highway, or Tok Cut-Off; meanwhile, portions of the Seward Highway are numbered AK-1, AK-9 and Interstate A3 (A-3).

Highways

U.S. Highways

The Alaskan portion of the Alaska Highway was proposed to be designated part of U.S. Highway 97 (US-97), but this was never carried out. Certain prior editions of USGS topographic maps, mostly published during the 1950s, do bear the US-97 highway shield along or near portions of the current AK-2.

Alaska numbered highways

Alaska named highways 
Highways listed below are not signed as numbered state routes.

Marine Highway system
The Alaska Marine Highway and several other Alaska highways or routes are recognized as "highways" eligible for federal funding by the Federal Highway Administration (FHWA). The Marine Highway was declared a National Scenic Byway by the FHWA on June 13, 2002; and later declared an All-American Road on September 22, 2005.

The system is divided into different regions of service: Southeast, Cross-Gulf, Prince William Sound, South-Central, and Southwest.

Gallery

See also

 List of British Columbia provincial highways
 List of Yukon territorial highways
The Milepost

References

External links
 from the Alaska Department of Transportation & Public Facilities

Alaska Routes